A source-code-hosting facility (also known as forge) is a file archive and web hosting facility for source code of software, documentation, web pages, and other works, accessible either publicly or privately. They are often used by open-source software projects and other multi-developer projects to maintain revision and version history, or version control. Many repositories provide a bug tracking system, and offer release management, mailing lists, and wiki-based project documentation. Software authors generally retain their copyright when software is posted to a code hosting facilities.

General information

Features

Version control systems

Popularity

Discontinued: CodePlex, Gna!, Google Code.

Specialized hosting facilities
The following are open-source software hosting facilities that only serve a specific narrowly focused community or technology.

Former hosting facilities 

 Alioth (Debian) – In 2018, Alioth has been replaced by a GitLab based solution hosted on salsa.debian.org. Alioth has been finally switched off in June 2018.
 BerliOS – abandoned in April 2014
 Betavine – abandoned somewhere in 2015.
 CodeHaus – shut down in May 2015
 CodePlex – shut down in December 2017.
 Fedora Hosted – closed in March 2017
 Gitorious – shut down in June 2015.
 Gna! – shut down in 2017.
 Google Code – closed in January 2016, all projects archived. See http://code.google.com/archive/.
 java.net – Java.net and kenai.com hosting closed April 2017.
 Phabricator – wound down operations 1 June 2021, all projects continued to be hosted with very limited support after 31 August 2021.
 Tigris.org – shut down in July 2020.

See also

 Comparison of version-control software
 Distributed version control
 Forge (software)
 List of free software project directories
 List of version-control software
 Source code escrow for closed-source software
 Version control (source-code-management systems)

Notes

References

External links
 

Online services comparisons
 
Free software lists and comparisons